Acrocercops quadrisecta is a moth of the family Gracillariidae. It is found in India (Maharashtra and Maharashtra).

The larvae feed on Bridelia retusa and Bridelia stipularis. They probably mine the leaves of their host plant. The mine starts as a wandering narrow gallery and then an irregularly shaped blotch under the upper cuticle of the leaf.

References

quadrisecta
Moths described in 1932
Moths of Asia